Pukeiti Pukeiti (c. 1948 - 18 October 2012) was a Cook Islands politician and Member of the Cook Islands Parliament. He was a member of the Cook Islands Party.  He represented the electorate of Tamarua.

Pukeiti was elected to Parliament in the 2009 Tamarua by-election following the death of MP Mii Parima.  He was re-elected at the 2010 election.

Pukeiti's death precipitated the 2013 Tamarua by-election.

References

Members of the Parliament of the Cook Islands
Cook Islands Party politicians
2012 deaths
People from Mangaia
Year of birth uncertain